Sung J. Woo (born June 8, 1971) is a Korean-American writer of three works of fiction.  He was born in Seoul, South Korea.

Personal 
Woo came to the United States in 1981, when he was ten years old. He grew up in Ocean Township, New Jersey. He received his B.A. in English from Cornell University in 1994 and received his M.F.A. in creative writing from New York University in 2006. Woo currently lives in Washington Township, Warren County, New Jersey.

Works
Woo's short story Limits received the 2008 Raymond Carver Short Story Contest Editor's Choice Award from Carve Magazine.

Woo has also published non-fiction. His essays have been published in The New York Times, The New York Times Magazine and KoreAm Journal.

Bibliography

Short stories
 Limits (2008)

Novels
 Everything Asian (2009), .
 Love Love (2015), .
 Skin Deep (2020), .

References

External links
Sung J. Woo: Official homepage
The New York Times Magazine, Lives: "Like Father?"
The New York Times, Generations: "Not Just a Place for Food, but for Bonding"
The New York Times, Modern Love: "Overfed on a Mother’s Affection"
The New York Times, Private Lives: "Saying ‘I Love You’ With Baseball"
The New York Times, Ties: "The Unexpected Branch on the Family Tree"
WBUR Modern Love Podcast: "Overfed On A Mother's Affection | With Kumail Nanjiani and Emily Gordon"
Sung J Woo at Library of Congress Authorities

American writers of Korean descent
Living people
Cornell University alumni
New York University alumni
1971 births
21st-century American novelists
American male novelists
American novelists of Asian descent
People from Ocean Township, Ocean County, New Jersey
People from Washington Township, Warren County, New Jersey
American male short story writers
21st-century American short story writers
21st-century American male writers
Novelists from New Jersey
South Korean emigrants to the United States